Kelly Lynn Davis is a journalist and investigative reporter from San Diego, California.

Career 
Davis helped launch San Diego CityBeat in 2002 with David Rolland and was one of the main editors.
In March 2015, Davis left Southland Publishing, Inc, the publisher of San Diego CityBeat. After leaving CityBeat, Davis became a freelance writer. In May 2020, Davis joined The Appeal as a senior editor.
Davis has covered California laws about sex offenders, and has investigated San Diego's homeless situation.

Inmate deaths 
Davis and Dave Maass released a 5-part investigative series starting in 2013 in San Diego CityBeat about inmates dying in San Diego jails at the highest rates in the state, many of which were preventable deaths. This series won investigative awards and resulted in new policies and training to reduce suicides. In 2014, after the series had received widespread media attention, an inmate hanged himself while imprisoned and his widow sued San Diego county for negligence. In 2017, San Diego county claimed they didn't know about any problems with inmate deaths despite the widespread media coverage, and demanded that Davis provide her private investigative "notes, interviews and recordings" to help in San Diego's case against the widow. Davis refused. Many media outlets decried the request as inappropriate and a judge ordered a stay. It's been insinuated that San Diego county is trying to target or punish Davis for bringing negative media attention regarding the inmate deaths.

California right-to-die law 
Davis received national attention in 2016 for an essay she wrote about her sister Betsy, who suffered from late-stage ALS and legally ended her life under California's right-to-die law.

Personal life 
Davis is a breast cancer survivor.

References

External links 
Voices of San Diego - Kelly Davis

American newspaper journalists
American women journalists
American women writers
Living people
Year of birth missing (living people)
21st-century American women